Gzy  is a village in Pułtusk County, Masovian Voivodeship, in east-central Poland. It is the seat of the gmina (administrative district) called Gmina Gzy.

References

Gzy